Lisa Campbell is a Canadian lawyer and civil servant who has been the president of the Canadian Space Agency since 2020.

Education and legal career 
Campbell completed a Bachelor of Arts in political science from McGill University in 1988, followed by an LL.B from Dalhousie Law School in 1991. She worked as a lawyer in the fields of criminal, employment and constitutional law.

Federal government career 
After becoming assistant deputy minister of defence and marine procurement, where she was involved in military procurement such as fighter jet replacement, Campbell went on to become associate deputy minister for Veterans Affairs Canada.

President of the Canadian Space Agency 
On September 3, 2020, Campbell was announced as the new president of the Canadian Space Agency, becoming the first woman appointed to the role in a full-time capacity. She replaced outgoing President Sylvain Laporte.

References 

Canadian women lawyers
21st-century Canadian civil servants
Presidents of the Canadian Space Agency
Canadian women civil servants
Year of birth missing (living people)
Living people